= Right To Know =

American nonprofit organization

Right To Know is a non profit support project for those who discover via genealogical genetic testing that their lineage is not what they had supposed it to be due to family secrets and misattributed parentage, thus raising existential issues of adoption, race, ethnicity, culture, rape, etc. Matters of inheritance can also be fraught, in part because state laws differ to begin with, some of which do not take the technology into account.

== See also ==
- Genealogy
- Genetic testing
